Azorubine is an azo dye consisting of two naphthalene subunits. It is a red solid. It is mainly used in foods that are heat-treated after fermentation. It has E number E122.

Uses
In the US, this color was listed in 1939 as FD&C Red No. 10 for use in externally applied drugs and cosmetics. It was delisted in 1963 because no party was interested in supporting the studies needed to establish safety. It was not used in food in the US.

In the EU, azorubine is known as E number E122, and is authorized for use in certain foods and beverages, such as cheeses, dried fruit, and some alcoholic beverages, and is permitted for use as an excipient in medications.

There are no provisions for azorubine in the Codex Alimentarius.

Safety
Azorubine has shown no evidence of mutagenic or carcinogenic properties and an acceptable daily intake (ADI) of 0–4 mg/kg was established in 1983 by the WHO. In rare instances, it may cause skin and respiratory allergic reactions even to FDA approved dosages.

No evidence supports broad claims that food coloring causes food intolerance and ADHD-like behavior in children.  It is possible that certain food coloring may act as a trigger in those who are genetically predisposed, but the evidence is weak.

References

Food colorings
Azo dyes
Organic sodium salts
Naphthalenesulfonates
1-Naphthols
E-number additives
Acid dyes